Gaszowice may refer to the following villages in Poland:
Gaszowice in Rybnik County, Silesian Voivodeship (S Poland)
Gaszowice in Oleśnica County, Lower Silesian Voivodeship (SW Poland)